Fairfield High School may refer to:

Australia
 Fairfield High School (New South Wales), Australia

United Kingdom
 Fairfield High School, Bristol, in Bristol, England
 Fairfield High School, Peterchurch, in Herefordshire, England
 Fairfield High School for Girls, in Droylsden, Manchester, England
 Fairfield High School, Widnes, in Cheshire, England

United States
 Fairfield High School (California), in Fairfield, California
 Fairfield Community High School, in Fairfield, Illinois
 Fairfield High School (Iowa), in Fairfield, Iowa
 Fairfield High School (Kansas), in Langdon, Kansas; see Fairfield USD 310
 Fairfield High School (Montana), in Fairfield, Montana
 Fairfield High School (Leesburg, Ohio)
 Fairfield High School (Fairfield, Ohio)
 Fairfield High School (Texas), in Fairfield, Texas
 Fairfield Christian Academy, in Lancaster, Ohio)
 Fairfield Union High School, in Lancaster, Ohio
 Fairfield Warde High School, in Fairfield, Connecticut (renamed from Fairfield HS in 2005)
 Fairfield Ludlowe High School, in Fairfield, Connecticut, split off from Fairfield Warde

See also
 Fairfield (disambiguation)